Sang Kar or Sang-e Kar may refer to:
 Sang Kar, Fars
 Sang Kar, Kerman
 Sang Kar, Lorestan